Van Buskirk is a surname. Notable people with the surname include:

Harold Van Buskirk (1894–1980), American architect and fencer
Jacob Van Buskirk (1760–1834), Canadian merchant, judge and politician
John van Buskirk (born 1972), American soccer player and coach
Pieter Van Buskirk (c. 1665 – 1738), American settler
Scott R. Van Buskirk, United States Navy admiral
William C. Van Buskirk, American academic

See also
Van Buskirk Island, man-made island in New Jersey, United States
Van Buskirk, Wisconsin, unincorporated community in the United States
Van Buskirk-Oakley House, historic house in Oradell, New Jersey
Andries Thomas Van Buskirk House, historic house in Saddle River, New Jersey

Surnames of Dutch origin